Khaleh Saray-e Panjah va Haft (also Romanized as Khāleh Sarāy-e Panjāh va Haft; also known as Khālehsarā-ye Panjāhohaft) is a village in Khaleh Sara Rural District, Asalem District, Talesh County, Gilan Province, Iran. At the 2006 census, its population was 1,994, in 505 families.

References 

Populated places in Talesh County